V.V.I.P is the debut extended play (EP) by Korean singer Seungri, member of Big Bang. The album debut in number one on South Korea, and sold 41,812 copies and become the fourth best-selling album by a male artist in 2011

Seungri wrote and produce 6 out of 7 songs in the album, along with creating the choreography for the title song. Two singles were released from the album, with music videos produced for both, "VVIP" and "What Can I Do?". The two singles won, combined, five number-one trophies in Music shows.

Track listing

Charts

Sales

Music program awards

See also
Big Bang (South Korean band)
YG Entertainment

References

2011 albums
YG Entertainment albums
Seungri albums
Korean-language EPs
2011 debut EPs